South Ockendon is a town, former civil parish and Church of England parish within the Thurrock borough in Essex in the East of England, United Kingdom. It is located on the border with Greater London, just outside the M25 motorway. The area to the north is North Ockendon. In 2019 it had an estimated population of 22,303 and in the 2021 United Kingdom census it had a population of 22,442  In 1931 the parish had a population of 1355.

History
South Ockendon is an ancient parish. It was a village before the Norman Conquest, had a priest in 1085. is listed in the Domesday Book as "Wocheduna", conjecturally named after a Saxon chief, Wocca, whose tribe allegedly lived on a hill. The suffix "don" in Old English means a low hill in open country. Until the late 1940s, the village centred on The Village Green, with its Norman church of St. Nicholas of Myra and adjoining "The Royal Oak" a 14th-century tavern with a 17th-century northern extension. North, South and West Roads all converge on The Green. The railway through Ockendon station was built in 1892 as a through line from Tilbury Dock to the Midlands and further via Upminster and Romford and now is a major commuter route between Southend and Fenchurch Street via Barking.

In 1912, "Mollands Farm" to the south of the original village was acquired for use as a 'rehabilitation' facility for what are now termed 'disadvantaged' or 'educationally challenged' people who were put to useful work on the farm. Over time the farm developed into a major mental hospital (known locally as The Colony) or as South Ockendon Hospital. The hospital closed in 1994 and most of the buildings were subsequently demolished and the site was redeveloped as the Brandon Groves Estate.

South Ockendon village became a location for prefabricated houses (prefabs) accommodating bombed-out residents of East London/West Essex in the very late 40s. The majority of these were demolished in the late-1960s when a large Greater London Council estate, Lecaplan "concrete" construction homes – the Flowers' Estate – was built to replace them, once more with pre-fabricated dwellings, albeit of a superior design.  The Lecaplan Type B form of pre-cast concrete (large panel concrete) terrace is constructed in rows of eight properties to a design by J C Tilley and manufactured by W. & C. French.

On 1 April 1936 the parish was abolished to form Thurrock.

In the 1970s the Ford Motor Company factory at Aveley housed Ford's Advanced Vehicle Operations which built cars such as the RS1600. The plant was wound down gradually from the late 1990s but closed entirely in 2004, when the last 150 jobs were lost. The majority of the 150 workers accepted transfers to other Ford or ancillary sites around Essex. The 'Aveley' plant was situated along and west of the railway line, adjacent to Ockendon station in the Belhus Ward that part of Ockendon has now been developed into new housing estates, with street names after famous Ford vehicles in keeping with the sites history.

Transport
The railway line from Upminster to Grays separates the old village of South Ockendon from Belhus. The line is a spur between Grays Thurrock and Upminster of the line from Fenchurch Street Station to Southend and Shoeburyness.

South Ockendon is served by Transport for London. As of Autumn 2015, bus 370 runs between Romford and Lakeside via South Road and bus 347 serves Romford from Ockendon station via Upminster and Harold Wood. Essex services connect the village directly with Basildon, Brentwood, Purfleet, Grays and Aveley.

Education
Secondary education is provided by Harris Academy Ockendon (formally known as The Ockendon Academy, prior to that it was called The Ockendon School. Other schools in Ockendon included Culverhouse Comprehensive School which was demolished in 1992 and Lennard's Secondary Modern School ). The Ockendon Academy joined the Harris family of schools in September 2019, with the aim to improve academic performance.

References

 
Villages in Essex
Former civil parishes in Essex
Thurrock